Gennadi Vladimirovich Strikalov (born October 17, 1969) is a Russian professional football coach and a former player. He is a goalkeepers' coach with FC Dynamo Stavropol.

Club career
He made his debut in the Russian Premier League in 2000 for FC Krylia Sovetov Samara.

See also
Football in Russia
List of football clubs in Russia

References

1969 births
Living people
Russian footballers
Association football goalkeepers
FC Tekstilshchik Kamyshin players
FC Dynamo Stavropol players
PFC Krylia Sovetov Samara players
FC Lokomotiv Nizhny Novgorod players
FC Khimki players
FC Salyut Belgorod players
Russian Premier League players
FC Asmaral Moscow players
FC Mashuk-KMV Pyatigorsk players